Blanche of Brittany (1271–1327) was a daughter of John II, Duke of Brittany, and his wife Beatrice of England. She is also known as Blanche de Dreux. Through her mother she was the granddaughter of King Henry III of England and Eleanor of Provence.

Marriage and issue
Blanche was married in Paris sometime after November 1281 to Philip of Artois, who was the son of Robert II of Artois and Amice de Courtenay. The couple had seven children, they were:
 Margaret (1285–1311), married in 1301 Louis, Count of Évreux
 Robert III of Artois (1287–1342), married in 1318 Joan of Valois
 Isabella (1288–1344), a nun at Poissy
 Joan (1289 – aft. 1350), married in 1301 in Senlis, Gaston I, Count of Foix
 Othon (died 2 November 1291)
 Marie of Artois (1291 – 22 January 1365, Wijnendaele), Lady of Merode, married in 1309 in Paris John I, Marquis of Namur. She was the mother of Blanche of Namur.
 Catherine (1296–1368, Normandy), married John II of Ponthieu, Count of Aumale and had issue, a daughter Joan of Ponthieu

Blanche's husband served under his father at the Battle of Furnes, where he was wounded. He never recovered, and died of the effects over a year later. His premature death led to a legal battle later, when Artois was left to his sister Mahaut rather than his son Robert. Robert was never the proper Count of Artois, on Mahaut's death Artois passed to her daughter, Joan II, Countess of Burgundy.

Blanche's daughter Margaret was the mother of Philip III of Navarre who was married to Joan II of Navarre. Her sister, Marie was married to Guy IV, Count of Saint-Pol.

Blanche died on 19 March 1327 at the Chateau de Bois-de-Vincennes, and was buried in the now-demolished church of the Couvent des Jacobins in Paris.

Ancestry

See also

List of rulers of Brittany
Artois

References

Sources

1271 births
1327 deaths
House of Artois
House of Dreux
13th-century French people
13th-century French women
14th-century French people
14th-century French women